The 2015 ITF Women's Circuit is the 2015 edition of the second tier tour for women's professional tennis. It is organised by the International Tennis Federation and is a tier below the WTA Tour. The ITF Women's Circuit includes tournaments with prize money ranging from $10,000 up to $100,000.

Schedule

January–March

April–June

July–September

October–December

Ranking points distribution 

"+H" indicates that hospitality is provided.

Retirements

Comebacks

See also 
 2015 WTA Tour
 2015 WTA 125K series
 2015 ATP World Tour
 2015 ATP Challenger Tour
 2015 ITF Men's Circuit

External links 
 International Tennis Federation (ITF)

 
2015
2015 in tennis
2015 in women's tennis